The following is the final results of the Iranian Volleyball Super League (Innovation and Flourishing Cup) 2008/09 season.

Standings 

 Shahrdari Hamedan were excluded from the league with five games remaining. All results were declared null and void.
 Foolad and BEEM shared the third place because BEEM had the better points ratio before excluding Shahrdari Hamedan's results from the table.
 The match between Petrochimi and Damash remains unfinished in the fourth set by the match commissioner.

Results

* Forfeit

References 
 volleyball.ir 
 www.radiovarzesh.ir

League 2008-09
Iran Super League, 2008-09
Iran Super League, 2008-09
Volleyball League, 2008-09
Volleyball League, 2008-09